James Cumming  (born March 7, 1961) is a Canadian politician who was elected to represent the riding of Edmonton Centre in the House of Commons of Canada in the 2019 Canadian federal election. Cumming formerly served as the President and CEO of the Edmonton Chamber of Commerce. Cumming is a member of the Conservative Party of Canada. He succeeded and preceded Liberal politician Randy Boissonault as the MP for Edmonton Centre, having run in the 2015 Canadian federal election and placed second before he was elected in 2019. In the 2021 Canadian federal election, he was again defeated by Boissonnault.

Member of Parliament
During the 43rd Canadian Parliament Cumming introduced one private member's bill: Bill C-229, An Act to repeal certain restrictions on shipping which sought to repeal the previous parliament's Oil Tanker Moratorium Act. It was brought to a vote on February 3, 2021, but defeated with only Conservative Party members voting in favour. On November 29, 2019, Conservative Party leader Andrew Scheer appointed Cumming to be the party's critic for Small Business and Export Promotion. In the 2020 Conservative Party of Canada leadership election he endorsed Peter MacKay. After Erin O'Toole won the leadership election, he appointed Cumming to be the critic for Innovation, Science and Industry on September 8, 2020. On February 10, 2021, Cumming was appointed to a newly created position, critic for COVID-19 economic recovery.

Electoral record

References

Living people
Conservative Party of Canada MPs
Members of the House of Commons of Canada from Alberta
Politicians from Edmonton
1961 births